Mount Ainslie is a hill with an elevation of   that is located in the northeastern suburbs of Canberra, in the Australian Capital Territory, Australia. Mount Ainslie lies within part of the Canberra Nature Park.

Location and features

According to an article written in 1922, this outlook "will afford an ever changing bird's eye and panoramic picture of the city's buildings and beauty spots, as well as of the lovely plains that run to join the Yass Plains on the north." An air beacon located at the summit is part of the national capital's air navigation system guiding air traffic towards the nearby Canberra Airport.

A walking trail which leads from the back of the Australian War Memorial, called the Mount Ainslie Kokoda summit trail, is well maintained with steps and is paved. The trail is used by around 200 people each day. It has a number of plaques commemorating the battles fought in World War II in the Kokoda Trail in Papua New Guinea, with the plaques set out as though it was on the Kokoda Trail.

Mount Ainslie is the northernmost point of a land axis, planned by Walter Burley Griffin, that stretches through North and South Canberra. This axis takes in the Australian War Memorial and the old and new Parliament Houses. In 1912, Burley won the international design competition for the capital and called the area an "irregular amphitheatre". The design included his wife's inputs, and thus the view from the summit of Mount Aisle was named as Marion Mahony Griffin in 2013.

Summit design competition
In 2016 the ACT Government and the National Capital Authority ran a design competition for, with the aim to produce a ten-year strategy for the Mount Ainslie summit. The competition winners were Sue Barnsley and Jane Irwin, who proposed new parking, signage, picnic areas, lawns and plantings.

References

External links

Mount Ainslie Map

Mount Ainslie
Mountains of the Australian Capital Territory
Volcanoes of the Australian Capital Territory
Silurian volcanism